Maginnis, Walsh and Sullivan, an American architecture firm active from its founding in 1898 to its dissolution in 1905.  

The principals were Charles Donagh Maginnis (1867-1955), Timothy Walsh (1868-1934), and Matthew Sullivan (1868-1948).  Sullivan left the firm in 1905 for solo practice; the other two continued as Maginnis & Walsh for decades.  

Work at:

 St. Patrick's Roman Catholic Church, Whitinsville, Massachusetts, 1898
 St. John the Evangelist Church, Cambridge, Massachusetts, 1905
 St. Thomas the Apostle Catholic Church, Los Angeles, California, 1905
 school at St. Mary's Complex, Taunton, Massachusetts, 1907
 Huntington Avenue building, Girls' Latin School, Boston, Massachusetts, with architects Peabody & Stearns and Coolidge & Carlson, completed 1907

References 

Defunct architecture firms based in Massachusetts
Companies based in Boston
Architects from Boston
American ecclesiastical architects
Architects of Roman Catholic churches